Alqomar Tehupelasury (born 16 June 1995) is an Indonesian footballer who plays as a midfielder for PSPS Pekanbaru.

Career

PSPS Pekanbaru
In 2017, Alqomar joined PSPS Pekanbaru in the 2017 Liga 2.

International career
He made his international debut for Indonesia U-19 on 10 September 2013, and scoring one goal against Brunei U-19.

International goals
International under-19 goals

Honours 
Indonesia U-19
Winner
 AFF U-19 Youth Championship: 2013

References

1995 births
Living people
Indonesian footballers
PSPS Pekanbaru players
Liga 1 (Indonesia) players
People from Ambon, Maluku
Sportspeople from Maluku (province)
Association football midfielders